Roberto Andres Reyes Loyola (born 4 February 1988) is a Chilean footballer that currently plays as a midfielder for Deportes Concepción in the Segunda División Profesional de Chile.

Club career
Product of Everton youth set-up, he was member of the 2008 Torneo Apertura team champion.

Honours

Club
Everton
Primera División de Chile (1): 2008 Apertura
Primera B (1): 2011 Apertura

References

External links
 
 

1988 births
Living people
Chilean footballers
People from Viña del Mar
Everton de Viña del Mar footballers
Deportes Copiapó footballers
Cobresal footballers
Santiago Morning footballers
Ñublense footballers
A.C. Barnechea footballers
Deportes Concepción (Chile) footballers
Chilean Primera División players
Primera B de Chile players
Segunda División Profesional de Chile players
Association football midfielders
People from Valparaíso Province
People from Valparaíso Region
Sportspeople from Viña del Mar